Clairmont is a hamlet in northern Alberta, Canada within the County of Grande Prairie No. 1. Previously an incorporated municipality, Clairmont dissolved from village status on January 1, 1946 to become part of the Municipal District of Bear Lake No. 740.

Initially the area was commonly known as Twin Lakes. The first use of the name "Clairmont" was in 1907 by the earliest surveyor of the township boundaries, JB Saint Cyr.

History 

Development of the townsite really got started once it was surveyed and after the arrival of the Edmonton, Dunvegan & British Columbia Railway in 1916. By the end of 1916, the townsite had a railway station, two or three grain elevators, an agent's house, the Buffalo Lakes Lumber Yard, Clairmont Hotel, a Union Bank, a butcher shop, several stores, a Baptist church, and a handful of residences. On September 10, 1915 the Clairmont Lake School District was opened. A post office was established in 1916. In 1922, a large fire consumed many Clairmont businesses, while a train station was built in 1923.

Clairmont was incorporated as a village in 1917, but renounced the village status in 1946 after a downturn in economy caused by the great depression. It eventually became the location of the County of Grande Prairie No. 1's municipal office.

A new school was built with municipal funding in 2007 and opened in 2008.

Demographics 

The Hamlet of Clairmont had a population of 5,135 in the 2021 Census of Population.

See also 
List of communities in Alberta
List of former urban municipalities in Alberta
List of hamlets in Alberta

References 

County of Grande Prairie No. 1
Hamlets in Alberta
Former villages in Alberta